Ekaterina Viktorovna Korshunova (born 24 May 1988) is a Russian shooter. She represented her country at the 2016 Summer Olympics.

References 

1988 births
Living people
Russian female sport shooters
Shooters at the 2016 Summer Olympics
Olympic shooters of Russia
Universiade medalists in shooting
Universiade gold medalists for Russia
Shooters at the 2015 European Games
European Games medalists in shooting
European Games bronze medalists for Russia
Medalists at the 2013 Summer Universiade
21st-century Russian women